Waldhausen im Strudengau (Central Bavarian: Woidhausn im Strudngau) is a municipality in the district of Perg in the Austrian state of Upper Austria.

Geography
Waldhausen lies in the Mühlviertel. It was originally a part of Bavaria. About 52 percent of the municipality is forest, and 44 percent is farmland.

Personalities
 Konrad von Waldhausen (1320/1325–1369), early religious reformer.
Another famous person born here is Josef Hader, one of Austria's most renowned actors and comedians.

Population

References

Cities and towns in Perg District